is a private junior college in Otsu, Shiga, Japan. Founded in 1970 as a junior women's college, it became coeducational in 2008.

External links
 Official website 

Educational institutions established in 1970
Private universities and colleges in Japan
Universities and colleges in Shiga Prefecture
Japanese junior colleges
Buildings and structures in Ōtsu